Dhanuvachapuram is a village in Thiruvananthapuram district  in the state of Kerala, India. It is located at a height of about 100 meters from sea level. Dhanuvachapuram is also known the education center of  Neyyattinkara  because  there are lot of colleges and schools situated here.

Locality
Poovar beach – 7 km away
Kovalam beach – 15 km away
Neyyar Dam – 30 km away

Education
 VTM NSS College, Dhanuvachapuram
 College of Applied Science, Dhanuvachapuram
Govt.ITI Dhanuvachapuram
Government girls school, Dhanuvachapuram
NKM Govt. Higher Secondary School

Railway station
Dhanuvachapuram Railway station

See also
Neyyattinkara
Parassala
Amaravila
vellarada

References

Villages in Thiruvananthapuram district